The Atatürkist Thought Association (ADD) is a secularist organization that espouses the ideas of Mustafa Kemal Atatürk, the founder of modern Turkey. It was founded by Hıfzı Veldet Velidedeoğlu, Muammer Aksoy, Hüsnü A. Göksel and Bahriye Üçok.

The association is opposed to the Islamist tenets enacted by Ayatollah Ruhollah Khomeini in Iran and wants to ensure that  religion and state remain separate in Turkey. The organization is known for initiating court cases against web sites which insult Atatürk, or with links to sites that insult Atatürk. It is credited with organising the 2007 Republic Protests.

People associated with ADD include former President of the Constitutional Court of Turkey Yekta Güngör Özden, former General Şener Eruygur (its head in 2009) and Tansel Çölaşan (its head since 2010).

Gallery

See also
 Secularism in Turkey
 Kemal Kerinçsiz

References and notes

External links
 Association's official website 

Organizations based in Ankara
Organizations established in 1989
Church–state separation advocacy organizations
1989 establishments in Turkey
Secularism in Turkey
Secularist organizations
Skeptic organizations in Turkey